Herpes: The Journal of the IHMF was a triannual peer-reviewed medical journal published by Cambridge Medical Publications and the official journal of the International Herpes Management Forum. It was indexed from 1997 in Scopus and from 2001 in Index Medicus/MEDLINE/PubMed, until 2009, when the last issue was published. Articles were usually solicited and publication was supported by an educational grant from GlaxoSmithKline and 3M Pharmaceuticals.

References

External links 
 
 Print: 
 Online: 

English-language journals
Publications established in 1996
Triannual journals
Microbiology journals
Publications disestablished in 2009